Following the 2021 fall of Kabul to the Taliban, diplomatic missions of Afghanistan set up by the deposed government, the Islamic Republic of Afghanistan, have largely continued operating. Because attempts by former Islamic Republic of Afghanistan officials to form a unified government in exile have been unsuccessful, these missions are operating independently, though some have been coordinating policy with each other directly. The Taliban government is aggressively pursuing control of Afghanistan's diplomatic missions, though it is also recognizing documents issued by the Islamic Republic of Afghanistan-aligned missions. In  former head of human resources at the Ministry of Foreign Affairs of Afghanistan Safiullah Wahdat claimed that approximately 45 embassies and 20 consulates aligned with the Islamic Republic of Afghanistan remain open.

Islamic Emirate of Afghanistan
No country has recognized the Islamic Emirate of Afghanistan as the legitimate successor to the Islamic Republic of Afghanistan.  Taliban appointees for embassy chargés d'affaires have been accredited by China, Iran, Pakistan, Russia, Turkey, and Turkmenistan. Additionally,  a Taliban appointee is running the Embassy in Qatar, but has not received diplomatic accreditation.

Asia

 Beijing (Embassy)
Accredited to 

 Teheran (Embassy)
 Mashad (Consulate-General)
 Zahedan (Consulate-General)

 Islamabad (Embassy)
 Karachi (Consulate-General)
 Peshawar (Consulate-General)
 Quetta (Consulate-General)

 Doha (Embassy)

 Ankara (Embassy)
 Istanbul (Consulate-General)

 Ashgabat (Embassy)
 Mary (Consulate-General)

Europe

 Moscow (Embassy)
Accredited to

Islamic Republic of Afghanistan

Africa

 Cairo (Embassy)

Americas

 Ottawa (Embassy)
Accredited to the 
 Toronto (Consulate-General)
 Vancouver (Consulate-General)

Asia

 Baku (Embassy)

 Dhaka (Embassy)

 New Delhi (Embassy)
 Hyderabad (Consulate-General)
 Mumbai (Consulate-General)

 Jakarta (Embassy)

 Baghdad (Embassy)

 Tokyo (Embassy)

 Amman (Embassy)

 Astana (Embassy)
 Almaty (Consulate-General) 

 Kuwait City (Embassy)

 Bishkek (Embassy)

 Kuala Lumpur (Embassy)

 Muscat (Embassy)

 Riyadh (Embassy)
 Jeddah (Consulate-General)

 Seoul (Embassy)

Colombo (Embassy)

 Dushanbe (Embassy)
 Kharogh (Consulate-General)

 Abu Dhabi (Embassy)
 Dubai (Consulate-General)

 Tashkent (Embassy)
 Termez (Consulate-General)

Europe

 Vienna (Embassy)

 Brussels (Embassy)

 Sofia (Embassy)

 Prague (Embassy)

 Paris (Embassy)

 Berlin (Embassy)
 Bonn (Consulate-General)
 Munich (Consulate-General)

 Athens (Embassy)

 Rome (Embassy)

 The Hague (Embassy)

 Oslo (Embassy)
Accredited to 

 Warsaw (Embassy)

 Madrid (Embassy)

 Stockholm (Embassy)

 Geneva (Embassy)

 Kyiv (Embassy)

 London (Embassy)

Oceania

 Canberra (Embassy)

Former missions
The missions in the U.S. were the first to close in the aftermath of the Taliban takeover, in March 2022.

 Washington, D.C. (Embassy)
 Los Angeles (Consulate-General)
 New York City (Consulate-General)

Multilateral organisations
 Brussels (permanent representation to the European Union)
 The Hague (permanent representation to the OPCW)
 Geneva (Permanent Mission to the United Nations Office)
 New York City (Permanent Mission to the United Nations Office)
 Paris (Permanent Mission to UNESCO)

Gallery

See also
 Foreign relations of Afghanistan
 Ambassadors of Afghanistan
 List of diplomatic missions in Afghanistan
 Visa policy of Afghanistan

Notes

References
Ministry of Foreign Affairs of the Islamic Republic of Afghanistan

 
Afghanistan
Diplomatic Missions